The Muradie Mosque or Lead Mosque is a Cultural Monument of Albania, located in Vlorë. The mosque was built in 1537 by the famous Ottoman Turkish architect Mimar Sinan during the rulership of Sultan Suleiman the Magnificent. The construction was completed in 1542 AD.

The mosque is located in downtown Vlora on a central square, surrounded on all four sides with roads. It is located on west of Sadik Zotaj, south of Lef Sallata and east of Papa Kristo Negovani streets. 

The structure consists of the main building and the minaret. The former is about 10 to 11 square meters while the minaret has a length of 18 metres. In the past, it also had a portico which has been destroyed later. The mosque has a dome with a supporting polygon raised base, arched windows and classical triangular forms topping the side walls. The brick work of the Muradie mosque has layers with two different brick colors. There is also a contrast between the texture, quality, color, as well as size and sequence of the bricks used to build the Islamic prayer hall compared with the larger white chiseled stones used to build the minaret.

It is believed that the cultural monument was designed by the prominent Ottoman architect, Mimar Sinani, a leading mosque builder in the Ottoman Empire and the author of the Great Suleymaniye Mosque in Constantinople (Istanbul).

See also 
 Islam in Albania
 List of mosques in Albania

References 

Cultural Monuments of Albania
Buildings and structures in Vlorë
Mimar Sinan buildings
Mosques in Vlorë County